Kjersti is a given name. Notable people with the given name include:

Kjersti Alveberg (born 1948), Norwegian choreographer and dancer
Kjersti Bale (born 1959), Norwegian philologist
Kjersti Beck (born 1979), Norwegian handball player
Kjersti Buaas (born 1982), Norwegian snowboarder
Kjersti Døvigen (born 1943), Norwegian actress
Kjersti Engan (born 1971), Norwegian researcher in signal and image processing 
Kjersti Ericsson (born 1944), Norwegian psychologist, criminologist, writer, poet and former politician
Kjersti Fløttum (born 1953), Norwegian linguist
Kjersti Graver (1945–2009), Norwegian jurist
Kjersti Grini (born 1971), Norwegian handball player
Kjersti Holmen (born 1956), Norwegian actress
Kjersti Horn (born 1977), Norwegian theater director and storyboard artist
Kjersti Markusson (born 1955), Norwegian politician
Kjersti Plätzer (born 1972), Norwegian race walker
Kjersti Reenaas (born 1981), Norwegian ski-orienteering competitor
Kjersti Scheen (born 1943), Norwegian journalist, illustrator, novelist, crime fiction writer and children's writer
Kjersti Annesdatter Skomsvold (born 1979), Norwegian author
Kjersti Løken Stavrum (born 1969), Norwegian journalist and editor
Kjersti Stenseng (born 1974), Norwegian politician
Kjersti Stubø (born 1970), Norwegian vocalist
Kjersti Thun (born 1974), Norwegian soccer player
Kjersti Toppe (born 1967), Norwegian politician